The International Pro Championship of Britain (also known as the Southport Dunlop Cup for sponsorship purposes) was a professional men's tennis tournament held at Victoria Park in Southport, England between 1935 and 1939. It was open to professional players only, amateurs were not allowed to compete. The tournament was held on outdoor En-tout-cas, "all-weather" artificial clay and was played in July, except for the 1939 edition, which was held in August. Hans Nüsslein won four consecutive titles from 1936 through 1939.

Past finals

Singles

Doubles

Draws

1935

1936

1938

See also
Major professional tennis tournaments before the Open Era

References

Clay court tennis tournaments
Tennis tournaments in England
Defunct tennis tournaments in the United Kingdom
Professional tennis tournaments before the Open Era
Recurring sporting events established in 1935
Recurring events disestablished in 1939
1935 establishments in England
1939 disestablishments in England